Gilbert Michell (c. 1557 – 28 March 1614), of Bodmin, Cornwall, was an English politician.

He was a Member (MP) of the Parliament of England for Bodmin in 1584–85.

References

1550s births
1614 deaths
English MPs 1584–1585
People from Bodmin
Members of the pre-1707 English Parliament for constituencies in Cornwall